Angie Arnephy (born ), also known as Angie, is a Seychellois singer and an ex-beauty pageant contestant. Shortly after contesting at Miss Seychelles 2015, she went into music, releasing her hit debut single "Bers Mon Lavi dan ou Love" which won her Best New Artist at the Airtel Music Awards 2015.

Early life and education
Arnephy was born and grew up in Anse Boileau, a district on the western part of Mahé, Seychelles. She had her early education at International School before she proceeded to the School of Advanced Studies, Anse Royale, Seychelles.

Career

Pageantry
She contested at the 2015 edition of Miss Seychelles and went on to be awarded Miss Photogenic.

Music
Upon competing at Miss Seychelles 2015, Angie went into music as a solo singer after Pure FM's programmes director Derrick Young-Khon approached her to record a song by Toulou, a Réunionese recording artist. She recorded her breakthrough single "Bers Mon Lavi dan ou Love", a remix of "Fe Viv a Mwin dan lo Love" by Toulou. The song shot her to prominence and later won her Best New Artist at the 3rd Airtel Music Awards. Currently working on her debut studio album, she released another single titled "3-2-1".

Discography

Singles
As lead artist

Awards and nominations

References

1997 births
Living people
21st-century Seychellois singers
Seychellois women singers
People from Anse Boileau
Seychellois beauty pageant contestants
21st-century women singers